Cresco is a city in Howard County, Iowa, United States. The population was 3,888 in the 2020 census, a decline from 3,905 in 2000 census. It is the county seat of Howard County.

History
Cresco was platted in 1866 at the time the railroad was expanding into the area. Cresco is a Latin phrase meaning "I grow". Cresco was incorporated on June 6, 1868.

On October 20, 1980, The David Letterman Show was broadcast from Cresco, the winner in a competition to host the show.

Geography
Cresco's longitude and latitude coordinates in decimal form are 43.374491, −92.115121.

Climate
Cresco experiences a humid continental climate (Köppen Dfb) with long, cold, snowy winters and very warm, humid summers.

Demographics

2010 census
As of the census of 2010, there were 3,868 people, 1,660 households, and 962 families residing in the city. The racial makeup of the city was 97.3% White, 0.4% African American, 0.1% Native American, 0.4% Asian, 0.7% from other races, and 1.1% from two or more races. Hispanic or Latino of any race were 1.6% of the population.

There were 1,660 households, of which 29.3% had children under the age of 18 living with them, 45.1% were married couples living together, 9.0% had a female householder with no husband present, 3.9% had a male householder with no wife present, and 42.0% were non-families. 36.3% of all households were made up of individuals, and 17.3% had someone living alone who was 65 years of age or older. The average household size was 2.26 and the average family size was 2.95.

The median age in the city was 39.8 years. 25.1% of residents were under the age of 18; 7.4% were between the ages of 18 and 24; 24.2% were from 25 to 44; 23.6% were from 45 to 64; and 19.7% were 65 years of age or older. The gender makeup of the city was 48.0% male and 52.0% female.

2000 census
As of the census of 2000, there were 3,905 people, 1,652 households, and 1,004 families residing in the city. The racial makeup of the city was 98.77% White, 0.23% African American, 0.15% Native American, 0.15% Asian, 0.03% from other races, and 0.67% from two or more races. Hispanic or Latino of any race were 0.72% of the population.

There were 1,652 households, out of which 30.5% had children under the age of 18 living with them, 49.0% were married couples living together, 8.1% had a female householder with no husband present, and 39.2% were non-families. 35.0% of all households were made up of individuals, and 19.5% had someone living alone who was 65 years of age or older.  The average household size was 2.27 and the average family size was 2.95.

Age spread: 25.6% under the age of 18, 7.1% from 18 to 24, 26.1% from 25 to 44, 18.5% from 45 to 64, and 22.8% who were 65 years of age or older.  The median age was 39 years. For every 100 females, there were 88.6 males.  For every 100 females age 18 and over, there were 87.0 males.

The median income for a household in the city was $32,236, and the median income for a family was $43,682. Males had a median income of $30,088 versus $21,444 for females. The per capita income for the city was $18,190.  About 2.1% of families and 6.8% of the population were below the poverty line, including 5.2% of those under age 18 and 5.9% of those age 65 or over.

Arts and culture

Museums and other points of interest
The Mighty Howard County Fair is held annually in Cresco every June. 2014 was the 121st year that the fair was held.

Cresco Community Theatre is a non-profit organization open to anyone with an idea or the desire to contribute. The decision of which shows to be produced on the Cresco stage are reached by the contributing members, and range from famously named productions to the locally written plays.

Cresco is home to the Glen Brand Wrestling Hall of Fame of Iowa that had its first inductee banquet in 1970.  there are 97 members who have made outstanding contributions to the sport of amateur wrestling.

Although Cresco is no longer on a railroad line, it is home to a restored Milwaukee Road FP7 diesel engine which is known as the Heritage Train and displayed in Beadle Park at the center of the city on Highway 9.
Cresco is also headquarters for Featherlite Trailers.

The Cresco post office contains a mural, Iowa Farming, painted in 1937 by Richard Haines. Murals were produced from 1934 to 1943 in the United States through the Section of Painting and Sculpture, later called the Section of Fine Arts, of the Treasury Department.

Media

The city newspapers is the weekly Cresco Times Plain Dealer, published on Wednesdays & “The Cresco Shopper” published on Tuesdays.

KCZQ 102.3 FM is a radio station licensed to Cresco. The studios are located just off Elm Street, next to Dollar General and across from Fareway Grocery. It is owned by Mega Media LTD and operations began in 1991.

Education
Cresco is home to one of the largest school districts in Iowa in terms of square miles, the Howard–Winneshiek Community School District. The district was formed from the merger of the Cresco, Lime Springs/Chester, Elma, and Ridgeway school districts, opening on July 1, 1960.  Crestwood Secondary School is the secondary school.

Notre Dame Catholic School in Cresco, and Trinity Catholic school in Protivin, offer private education to elementary school students. There was previously a Notre Dame High School in Cresco. Notre Dame High School graduated its final class in 1989.

Notable people

 Norman Borlaug, Nobel Peace Prize laureate
 Charles Bowers, cartoonist and filmmaker
 Ellen Church, the world's first female flight attendant
 Edward Aloysius Fitzgerald, the fourth bishop of the Roman Catholic Diocese of Winona
 Wilma Anderson Gilman (1881-1971), concert pianist, music teacher, clubwoman
 Maurice C. Gregory, United States Marine Corps brigadier general
 Hal Holmes, United States congressman
 Edward Howard, Roman Catholic archbishop of Portland, Oregon
 Edouard Izac, Medal of Honor recipient
 Frank J. Lowry, United States admiral
 Oliver Munson, Wisconsin state senator
 Harold Nichols, former Iowa State University wrestling coach, won six NCAA wrestling championships as coach
 Robert E. Smylie, 24th governor of Idaho; raised in Cresco
 Elmarie Wendel, American actress and singer
 Ernest J. Windmiller, Minnesota state legislator and businessmanMinnesota Legislators: Past & Present-Ernest J. Windmiller

Attractions

 Polygonal Barn, New Oregon Township, listed on the National Register of Historic Places

References

External links

 Cresco, Iowa Home Page Portal style website, Government, Business, Library, Recreation and more
 Notre Dame Elementary School
 Cresco Times Plain Dealer
 City-Data Comprehensive Statistical Data and more about Cresco

Cities in Iowa
Cities in Howard County, Iowa
County seats in Iowa
Populated places established in 1866
1866 establishments in Iowa